Keith Drury (born 1964) is a Northern Ireland artist initially known for oil paintings and for cityscapes created by 3D modelling. Many of his early oil on canvas artworks featured leading political and religious leaders. Some were controversial and raised criticism, with the more contentious works gaining national media attention.

Life and education 
Keith Alan Drury was born in the Newtownbreda area of Belfast.

Drury’s elementary education was at Newtownbreda Primary School and his secondary education was completed at Annadale Grammar School. He went on to graduate from Queen's University Belfast, QUB, with an Honours degree in Accountancy and Business, before working at Short Brothers and in the National Health Service. Returning to QUB, he graduated with a degree in Theology and became an ordained minister with the Presbyterian Church in Ireland. During this period, Drury was the Minister of May Street Church Belfast and served as a Board Member of Belfast City Centre Management, working with the Chamber of Commerce and Department for Regional Development. After 19 years in ministry, he resigned to become a professional artist in 2009. During this time, Drury combined art with graphic design and book publishing before his 3D modelling style became successful and he was able to work full-time as an artist.

The majority of Drury’s art is created at his gallery and studio (open to the public) on the Belmont Road in East Belfast.

Controversy 

Drury went professional as an artist in 2009. His early works were mainly oil on canvas and some featured controversial subjects, or included political and religious satire, often gaining much criticism.

One portrait showed DUP politician, Iris Robinson, wife of former First Minister of Northern Ireland in a 'Marilyn Monroe pose'. Another depicted Rev Dr Ian Paisley (also DUP) wearing an Irish Tricolour tie, alongside his opposite number, Sinn Féin's Martin McGuinness, in a Union Flag tie (an image seen as offensive by some from both political allegiances).

In 2010 Drury exhibited an oil painting in the Marketplace Theatre and Arts Centre in Armagh which alluded to the child abuse scandal in the Roman Catholic Church. It pictured Cardinal Sean Brady, head of the Catholic Church in Ireland, who was involved in an alleged cover-up, wearing a baby’s dummy (pacifier) instead of a crucifix. There were calls for the portrait to be removed from public display. Defending his work, Drury told the press that although people could choose to take offence, the painting could be viewed in a variety of ways.

Emerging style 

After the controversy, Drury moved away from oil on canvas and created a new style of artworks using 3D modelling. He used this technique to produce urban landscapes and cityscapes, featuring well-known local landmarks combined with elements of humor and political satire. Each picture can take up to three months to complete due to the complex modelling process and the high levels of detail included. Most of the scenes include a red telephone box, a red postbox and a clock which tells the same time. Drury deliberates for hours on inconsequential details such as a perforated brake disc on a Harley-Davidson motorbike. Many British and international towns and cities are featured in the artworks.

Commissioned artworks 
 
Drury presented an oil painting to Mary McAleese (then President of Ireland) in 2005 at a private dinner at her official state residence Áras an Uachtaráin in Dublin.

In 2007, Drury was commissioned by Irish author and film/documentary-maker, Don Mullan, to paint a portrait of Brazilian footballer Pelé. Drury personally presented the completed oil painting to Pelé at a Pelé Pequeno Principe Research Institute event he was hosting in Dublin.

Drury was commissioned to create a portrait of the newly inaugurated 44th US president Barack Obama in 2009. It was presented to The President’s Club Charitable Trust in Belfast on the day of the US presidential inauguration.
Later that year Drury travelled to Southampton to meet 97 year old Millvina Dean, the youngest passenger and last remaining survivor of the RMS Titanic disaster. He was the last person to officially interview her as she died a few days later.

Drury won an international competition in 2010 to produce a public commission artwork for Belfast City Council. The completed work is a collection of  portraits interpreting the Irish history and heritage of Belfast. The piece’s Irish title is: ‘Ar scath a cheile a mhaireas na daoine’ (‘It is in the shelter of each other that people live’) and featured five prominent Belfast Irish cultural revivalists. This mixed media artwork is on permanent public display as part of the city's art collection at Belfast City Hall.

The National Trust commissioned Drury to create an artwork to promote and celebrate a Van Morrison music festival at the Castle Ward Estate in 2013.

The artwork, Holywood Boulevard appeared in the BBC drama The Fall. Drury’s prints have also featured as part of a backdrop in a scene in the BBC crime series Line of Duty in 2019. In 2021, his ‘Rainfall Series’, oil on canvas artworks depicting iconic Belfast buildings, featured in the ITV production ‘Marcella’ with Anna Friel.

In 2016, the limited edition print London Way was presented to HRH Princess Anne at a reception in Buckingham Palace.

A number of significant corporate art commissions were completed in 2018. In June, MJM Marine commissioned a artwork to mark the launch of their contract to refurbish the Azamara Pursuit cruise ship. Danske Bank commissioned an artwork in September 2018 and Bunzl McLaughlin (part of Bunzl plc) presented Drury’s 'Up the Farset' artwork to the Hastings Hotel Group.

Philanthropic activity

Keith, along with his wife, Deborah, and former staff member, Matthew McComb, (a games developer with Asperger syndrome), were involved in a doctoral research project at Queen's University Belfast. They developed a virtual reality (VR) programme using specially created scenes in 3D to assist children with autism. This innovative project used 3D models of Keith’s art to create a virtual learning environment to help autistic children improve their coping mechanisms when faced with uncertain situations.

Keith and Deborah Drury are Patrons of the National Autistic Society (NAS) for Ards and North Down in Northern Ireland.

References 

1964 births
Living people
Artists from Belfast
Painters from Northern Ireland
Alumni of Queen's University Belfast
People educated at Annadale Grammar School